Ghazi Minara is a small village located in Sheikhupura, Punjab, Pakistan. It lies near a railway crossing on 3 km Lahore-Sargodha Road. The village was rich in terms of agriculture. However, due to increasing population, most of the land has been commercialized. It is close to the historical site Hiran Minar.

Villages in Sheikhupura District